The 1998 ATP Buenos Aires was an ATP Challenger Series tennis tournament held in Buenos Aires, Argentina. The tournament was held from November 16 to November 23.

Finals

Singles
 Younes El Aynaoui defeated  Alberto Martín 7–6, 6–1

Doubles
 Guillermo Cañas /  Martín García defeated  Alberto Martín /  Salvador Navarro 2–6, 6–3, 7–5

External links 
 International Tennis Federation (ITF) tournament edition details

 
ATP Buenos Aires
November 1998 sports events in South America